Kalmbach Media (formerly Kalmbach Publishing Co.) is an American publisher of books and magazines, many of them railroad-related, located in Waukesha, Wisconsin.

History 
The company's first publication was The Model Railroader, which began publication in the summer of 1933 with a cover date of January 1934. A press release announcing the magazine appeared in August 1933, but did not receive much interest.

In 1940, business was good enough for Kalmbach to launch another magazine about railroads in general with the simple title of Trains Magazine. From its first issue dated November 1940, it grew quickly from an initial circulation of just over 5,000.

Kalmbach became exclusively a publisher when it discontinued its printing operations in 1973, opting to contract production from other printers.

In 1985, Kalmbach purchased AstroMedia Corporation, adding its four magazines: Astronomy, Deep Sky, the children's science magazine Odyssey and Telescope Making. 

Kalmbach began publishing its annual Great Model Railroads in November 1990.

In 1991, Kalmbach purchased Greenberg Publishing of Sykesville, Maryland. Also included in the purchase was Greenberg Shows, which sponsored nearly two dozen combined model railroad and doll house shows on the East Coast. Intending to focus on the adult hobby and leisure market, Kalmbach sold the publication rights of the children's science magazine Odyssey to Cobblestone Publishing of Peterborough, New Hampshire in September 1991.

In January 1992, Kalmbach began publishing Earth magazine.

Kalmbach purchased Discover Media, publisher of the science magazine Discover, in August 2010.

Gerald B. Boettcher, the company's president, retired in June 2012. Charles R. Croft became the new president. 

In 2016 Kalmbach acquired Rather Dashing Games, a board game company based near Lexington, Kentucky. In 2018 the company sold the board game company to Loren and Heather Coleman, owners of game publisher Catalyst Game Labs. According to the Rather Dashing Games website, the company is now a division of Catalyst Game Labs.

In 2017 the company hired digital media veteran Dan Hickey as its sixth chief executive officer. Hickey was the first Kalmbach leader hired from outside the company in its 84-year history. The company was renamed Kalmbach Media in 2018.

Magazines

 Astronomy 
 Bead & Button (ceased publication after October 2020 issue)
 Classic Toy Trains Magazine 
 Classic Trains Magazine
 Discover
 Fine Scale Modeler Magazine 
 Garden Railways
 Model Railroader (its first periodical)
 Model Retailer
 Scale Auto
 Trains (its second periodical)

The company also produces some annual publications.

In addition, it publishes numerous books, including the Tourist Trains Guidebook. An illustrated compendium of more than 450 tourist railroads, dinner trains, and rail museums in the U.S. and Canada, the 300-page guidebook's 2009 edition provides reviews by Trains magazine staff and contributors. It was the original publisher of Jim Scribbins' The Hiawatha Story in 1970.

See also

List of English language book publishing companies

References

External links
 

1934 establishments in Wisconsin
Book publishing companies based in Wisconsin
Magazine publishing companies of the United States
Ornithological publishing companies
Publishing companies established in 1934
Rail transport publishing companies
Waukesha, Wisconsin